Steven Gow Calabresi (born 1958) is an American legal scholar and the Clayton J. and Henry R. Barber Professor of Law at Northwestern University Pritzker School of Law. He is the co-chairman of the Federalist Society. He is the nephew of Guido Calabresi, a U.S. Appellate judge and former dean of the Yale Law School.

Biography
Calabresi graduated from the Moses Brown School in Providence, Rhode Island, in 1976. He then attended Yale College, graduating cum laude in 1980. He received his J.D. degree from Yale Law School, where he was the Note & Topics Editor of the Yale Law Journal. After law school, he served as law clerk for Judge Ralph K. Winter of the U.S. Court of Appeals for the Second Circuit, Judge Robert Bork of the U.S. Court of Appeals for the District of Columbia Circuit, and Justice Antonin Scalia of the United States Supreme Court.

While at Yale Law School, Calabresi and two Yale College friends, Lee Liberman Otis and David McIntosh, founded the Yale chapter of the Federalist Society, one of the Society's three original chapters. In 2019, he was chairman of the Society's board of directors. Calabresi is an active libertarian-conservative author and commentator.

Calabresi joined the faculty of Northwestern Law School in 1990. He has been a visiting professor at Yale Law School (in the fall semesters of 2013, 2014, 2015, and 2016), and a visiting professor of political theory at Brown University, where he has taught since 2010.

Political life
Calabresi served under presidents Ronald Reagan and George H. W. Bush from 1985 to 1990. During that time, he advised Attorney General Edwin Meese III, and Reagan Domestic Policy Chief T. Kenneth Cribb, and wrote campaign speeches for Vice President Dan Quayle. Calabresi supports legally recognizing same-sex marriages. In 2016, Calabresi endowed the Abraham Lincoln Lecture on Constitutional Law at Northwestern Priztker School of Law in Chicago. The lecture's purpose is to show Lincoln's enormous talent as a constitutional lawyer and to reflect on what legal changes Lincoln's legacy might appropriately call for today.

With Gary S. Lawson, Calabresi has argued that the Mueller Probe was unlawful.

In July 2020, Calabresi wrote a New York Times editorial condemning a tweet by President Trump that floated postponing the 2020 election. Calabresi said the tweet "frankly appalled" him, called it "fascistic", and said it was "itself grounds for the president’s immediate impeachment again by the House of Representatives and his removal from office by the Senate."

Selected publications
Calabresi has published more than 65 articles in law reviews, including:

Calabresi, Steven G. "" A Government of Limited and Enumerated Powers": In Defense of United States v. Lopez." Michigan Law Review 94.3 (1995): 752-831.
Calabresi, Steven G., and Sarah E. Agudo. "Individuals Rights under State Constitutions When the Fourteenth Amendment Was Ratified in 1868: What Rights Are Deeply Rooted in American History and Tradition." Tex. L. Rev. 87 (2008): 7
Calabresi, Steven G., and Gary Lawson. "The Unitary Executive, Jurisdiction Stripping, and the Hamdan Opinions: A Textualist Response to Justice Scalia." Colum. L. Rev. 107 (2007): 1002.
Calabresi, Steven G., and Saikrishna B. Prakash. "The president's power to execute the laws." Yale LJ 104 (1994): 541.
Calabresi, Steven G., and Kevin H. Rhodes. "Structural Constitution: Unitary Executive, Plural Judiciary, The." Harv. L. Rev. 105 (1991): 1153.

He has written or edited several books, including:
 Calabresi, S. G. (2007). Originalism: A Quarter Century of Debate. Regnery Press.
 Calabresi, Steven G., and Christopher S. Yoo. The unitary executive: Presidential power from Washington to Bush. Yale University Press, 2008.
Michael Stokes Paulsen, Steven G. Calabresi, Michael W. McConnell, Samuel Bray & William Baude, The Constitution of the United States. (Foundation Press 2010) [casebook] (2d ed. 2013) (3d ed. 2017).

See also 
 List of law clerks of the Supreme Court of the United States (Seat 9)

References

External links
 

Law clerks of the Supreme Court of the United States
Federalist Society members
Living people
American lawyers
Northwestern University Pritzker School of Law faculty
Illinois Republicans
Moses Brown School alumni
Yale College alumni
Yale Law School alumni
Brown University faculty
1958 births